Leszek Borkowski (born 27 June 1952) is a Polish boxer. He competed in the men's bantamweight event at the 1976 Summer Olympics. At the 1976 Summer Olympics, he lost to Patrick Cowdell of Great Britain.

References

1952 births
Living people
Polish male boxers
Olympic boxers of Poland
Boxers at the 1976 Summer Olympics
Sportspeople from Łódź
Bantamweight boxers
21st-century Polish people
20th-century Polish people